The 2014–15 Alexela Korvpalli Meistriliiga was the 90th season of the Estonian basketball league and the second under the title sponsorship of Alexela. Kalev/Cramo came into the season as defending champions of the 2013–14 KML season.

The season started on 4 October 2014 and concluded on 22 May 2015 with TÜ/Rock defeating Kalev/Cramo 4 games to 1 in the 2015 KML Finals to win their 26th Estonian League title.

Teams

Coaching changes

Regular season
During the regular season teams will play 4 rounds for 32 games (2 at home and 2 away) with following exceptions:

 Kalev/Cramo will play 1 round at home and 1 away (1 at home and 1 away in total).
 TÜ/Rock will play 1 round at home (1 at home and 2 away in total).
 Audentes/Noortekoondis will play 1 round at home and 1 away (1 at home and 1 away in total).

Double points will be awarded to teams winning those games.

League table

First half of the season

Second half of the season

Playoffs

The playoffs began on 7 April and ended on 22 May. The tournament concluded with TÜ/Rock defeating Kalev/Cramo 4 games to 1 in the 2015 KML Finals.

Bracket

Individual statistics
Players qualify to this category by having at least 50% games played.

Points

Rebounds

Assists

Awards

Finals MVP
  Tanel Kurbas (TÜ/Rock)

Best Defender
  Janar Talts (TÜ/Rock)

Best Young Player
  Siim-Markus Post (Audentes/Noortekoondis)

Coach of the Year
  Gert Kullamäe (TÜ/Rock)

All-KML team

Player of the Month

See also
 2014–15 EuroChallenge
 2014–15 VTB United League
 2014–15 Baltic Basketball League

References

External links
Official website 

Korvpalli Meistriliiga seasons
Estonian
KML